Pectin lyase, also known as pectolyase, is a naturally occurring pectinase, a type of enzyme that degrades pectin. It is produced commercially for the food industry from fungi and used to destroy residual fruit starch, known as pectin, in wine and cider. In plant cell culture, it is used in combination with the enzyme cellulase to generate protoplasts by degrading the plant cell walls.

Pectin lyase catalyzes the following process:

Eliminative cleavage of (1→4)-α-D-alacturonan methyl ester to give oligosaccharides with 4-deoxy-6-O-methyl-α,-D-galact-4-enuronosyl groups at their non-reducing ends

This enzyme belongs to the family of lyases, specifically those carbon-oxygen lyases acting on polysaccharides.

Nomenclature 

The systematic name of this enzyme class is (1→4)-6-O-methyl-α-D-galacturonan lyase. Other names in common use include:

 endo-pectin lyase, 
 pectin methyltranseliminase, 
 pectin trans-eliminase, 
 pectolyase, 
 PL, 
 PMGL,
 PNL, and 
 polymethylgalacturonic transeliminase.

Structural studies

Biotechnology applications 

Pectin lyases are the only known pectinases capable of degrading highly esterified pectins (like those found in fruits) into small molecules via β-elimination mechanism without producing methanol (which is toxic), in contrast with the combination of PG and PE, which are normally found in commercial products. In addition, the presence of undesirable enzymatic activity in commercial pectinases may be detrimental to aroma because they are responsible for producing unpleasant volatile off flavour. There are many reports of fruit juice clarification by pectin lyases.

The alkaline pectinase is inappropriate for use in the food industry due to the acidic pH of fruit juices. However, they have a very high demand in the textile industries. They are used for retting of plant fibers such as ramie, sunn hemp, jute, flax and hemp.  The first report on retting of sunn hemp (Crotalaria juncea) by pectin lyase produced by Aspergillus flavus MTCC 7589 was published in 2008 but this aspect of pectin lyases needs to be extensively investigated further.

References

Further reading 
 
 
 
 

EC 4.2.2
Enzymes of known structure